Dragić (Cyrillic: Драгић) is a South Slavic surname. Notable people with the surname include:

 Dalibor Dragić (born 1972), Bosnian Serb footballer
 Dragan Dragić (born 1980), Serbian politician
 Goran Dragić (born 1986), Slovenian basketball player for the Milwaukee Bucks, Zoran's brother
 Labud Dragić (born 1954), Serbian writer of Montenegrin origin
 Mirjana Lehner Dragić (born 1936), Serbian painter
 Nedeljko Dragić (born 1936), Croatian animator
 Predrag Dragić (1945-2012), Serbian writer
 Tanja Dragić (born 1991), Serbian Paralympic athlete
 Zoran Dragić (born 1989), Slovenian basketball player for the Anadolu Efes, Goran's brother

See also
Dragičević
Dragović
Dragojević

Serbian surnames
Croatian surnames